Angelina Lauro is the name of a number of ships:
 , in service with Achille Lauro Line from 1932–40
 , in service with Lauro Lines from 1964 until 1979
 , a cruise ship in service with StarLauro 1989–1991

Ship names